is a Japanese footballer currently playing as a midfielder for Kashiwa Reysol as a designated special player.

Career statistics

Club
.

Notes

References

1999 births
Living people
Association football people from Chiba Prefecture
Tokyo International University alumni
Japanese footballers
Association football midfielders
Kashiwa Reysol players
Vonds Ichihara players